Waraseoni is a tehsil (administrative division) and Nagar Palika Parishad (municipality) in Balaghat district in the Indian state of Madhya Pradesh.
Waraseoni is second most populous town in Balaghat District after Balaghat.

Transportation
Waraseoni is connected via road to Balaghat, Katangi, Lalbarra, Seoni, Nagpur, Jabalpur, Chhindwara, Bhopal, Indore, Tumsar, Gondia and Bhandara. It is also connected by rail, lying on the Balaghat–Katangi section of the South East Central Railway zone (SECR) which runs trains connecting the city to Gondia Junction railway station on the Howrah–Nagpur–Mumbai line.

The nearest airport is Nagpur Airport.

City of Freedom Fighters
The city is known as the City of Freedom Fighters. Shri Kasturchand Ji Verma Hiralal Tamrakar, Dr Tekchand Jain, Kanhaiyalal Rusia, Thakur Prasad Tamrakar and Buddhu Lal Marathe are among the freedom fighters who participated in the struggle for independence from the British and Portuguese. Hiralal ji is now the only living freedom fighter in Balaghat District. Hiralal Tamrakar was congratulated by Indian President Ram Nath Kovind on 9 August 2017 at Rashtrapati Bhavan, the presidential mansion.

Demographics 
 India census, Waraseoni had a population of 176,291. There were 87,307 males and 88,984 females. There were 1,019 females to every 1,000 males. Waraseoni had an average literacy rate of 80%, higher than the national average of 73%. Male literacy was 87.8% and female literacy was 72.3%. 12% of the population was under 6 years of age.

The only language spoken is Hindi. Other dialects of Hindi are also spoken in some parts of Waraseoni.

Waraseoni is famous for rice crop production across the country. Many rice mills are present nearby the town.

Education 
Govt. S. S. P. Arts, Commerce & Science College – affiliated to Rani Durgavati Vishwavidyalaya Jabalpur.
College of Agriculture – affiliated with Jawaharlal Nehru Krishi Vishwa Vidyalaya Jabalpur.
Jawahar Navodaya Vidyalaya – a branch school, 1 of 589 across the country. It is co-educational and affiliated to Central Board of Secondary Education. All students are provided housing.
Sardar Patel Knowledge City, Dongariya – 5 separate institutions: College of Technology (engineering), Polytechnic College, Vindhya Siksha Samiti College, Satya Sai College of Education, and Mount Litera Zee school.
There are three private industrial training institutes (ITIs):

i) Shree Dutta Sai Pvt ITI Waraseoni

ii) Samrat Pvt ITI Waraseoni

iii) Shri Kashi Pvt ITI Waraseoni. There is also one mini-ITI located in Wara village.

Villages 
The following villages are within Waraseoni tehsil (administrative division) as of census 2011:

Notable locations
Other notable locations include an Ancient Jain temple on old Rampaili Road, an
ancient Shiv temple on Mandnpur Road, and a 20th-century Lord Shiv's Temple where people go for picnics. There is a viaduct called GotaDol on the Chandan River. On the banks of the Wainganga River is the Garra industrial area and a botanical garden.

Transport
The nearest airports are Nagpur(153kms), Jabalpur(235kms), Raipur(249kms).

References

Cities and towns in Balaghat district